The 2013 season of the astronomy TV show Star Gazers starring Dean Regas, James Albury, and Marlene Hidalgo started on January 7, 2013. The show's episode numbering scheme changed several times during its run to coincide with major events in the show's history. The official Star Gazer website hosts the complete scripts for each of the shows.


2013 season

References

External links 
  Star Gazer official website
  Star Gazers official website
 

Lists of Jack Horkheimer: Star Gazer episodes
2013 American television seasons